Le Voltaire was a French daily newspaper first published on 5 July 1878. It ceased publication in the 1930s.

Nicknamed Le Figaro républicain, the paper was created in order to support Gambetta, the leader of the Republican Union, the party of moderate radicals.

Its founding editor was Aurélien Scholl. The first issue announced that it was "daily, political, republican, satirical". The paper's name represented anticlericalism and it announced that "We know the potential dangers of the cowl-wearers." An editorial in the first issue said: 

Writers who contributed to the paper included Émile Zola, the Goncourt brothers, Guillaume Livet,<ref>Maupassant, contes et nouvelles, page 1535, Bibliothèque de la Pléiade</ref> and Paul Alexis. The paper also published longer works in serial form, including those of Zola and George Moore (A Mummer's Wife as La Femme du cabotin, July–October 1886).

A guide to Parisian newspaper published in 1882 described several of its writers as "some of the first journalists in France", one "brilliant" and another "teeming with imagination". It included Le Voltaire'' under the heading "Republican newspapers" and noted that it had published a long series of articles in favor of legalizing divorce.

Notes

External links 
 Le Voltaire (Paris. 1878) on 

1878 establishments in France
1930 disestablishments in France
Defunct newspapers published in France
French Third Republic
Newspapers published in Paris
Publications established in 1878
Publications disestablished in 1930
Daily newspapers published in France